The 1928 United States presidential election in Rhode Island took place on November 6, 1928, as part of the 1928 United States presidential election which was held throughout all contemporary 48 states. Voters chose five representatives, or electors to the Electoral College, who voted for president and vice president.

Rhode Island voted for the Democratic nominee, Governor Alfred E. Smith of New York, over the Republican nominee, Secretary of Commerce Herbert Hoover of California. Smith's running mate was Senator Joseph Taylor Robinson of Arkansas, while Hoover's running mate was Senate Majority Leader Charles Curtis of Kansas.

Smith won Rhode Island by a very narrow margin of 0.61%, making him the first Democratic presidential candidate since Woodrow Wilson in 1912 to carry the state, as well as the first to win an absolute majority of the vote since Franklin Pierce in 1852 (Wilson won the state in 1912, but only with a 39.04% plurality due to Republican vote splitting between President William Howard Taft and his immediate predecessor, Theodore Roosevelt, who challenged him with a third party). Although Hoover won more counties than Smith, key to Smith's victory were his appeal to "ethnic white" Roman Catholic voters in Providence County and Bristol County. Rhode Island was the only state save adjacent Massachusetts (another state with a large Catholic population) outside the Democratic "Solid South" that voted for Smith in 1928.

As Hoover became president in a nationwide electoral landslide, he became the first Republican elected president who did not carry Rhode Island. Given the scale of Hoover's win, Rhode Island was 18 percentage points more Democratic than the United States at large.

Beginning in 1928, Rhode Island would transition from a strongly Yankee Republican state into a Democratic-leaning state. Since then, Republicans have only carried the state four times, all in Republican landslide years: 1952, 1956, 1972, and 1984.

Rhode Island would not vote for another Republican presidential candidate until Dwight D. Eisenhower in 1952.

Results

By county

See also
 United States presidential elections in Rhode Island

References

Rhode Island
1928
1928 Rhode Island elections